Cromyatractus is a genus of radiolarians in the order Spumellaria.

References 

 Campbell, A. S. (1954). Radiolaria. Treatise on Invertebrate Paleontology. R. C. Moore. Lawrence, Kansas, USA, Geological Society of America and University of Kansas Press. Part. D, Protista 3: 11-195.

External links 

 
 Cromyatractus at geologie.mnhn.fr

Polycystines
Radiolarian genera